Jorge Quiñones may refer to:

 Jorge Quiñonez, Ecuadorian boxer
 Jorge Quiñones (volleyball) (born 1981), Mexican volleyball player